Dewey County is the name of two counties in the United States:

 Dewey County, Oklahoma 
 Dewey County, South Dakota